Boston High School, also known as Boston High School for Girls, is a selective grammar school and sixth form college for girls aged 11 to 18 in Boston, Lincolnshire, England. The school's sixth form has been coeducational since 1992.

A 2014 Ofsted report assessed both the school and the sixth form provision as "good", with "outstanding" leadership and management and "outstanding" behaviour and safety. A short inspection carried out in March 2018 found that the school continues to be good.

Admissions
Pupils joining in Year 7 are required, as with other selective grammar schools, to complete an 11+ verbal reasoning and non-verbal reasoning test. This test is carried out at the primary school, administered by the local grammar schools. The current PAN (published admission number) is 108.

Mid-year admissions applications are made through Lincolnshire County Council, who then ask the school to conduct an entry test - in the form of a Cognitive Abilities Test.

Year 11 pupils from any school can apply to join the co-educational Sixth Form as long as the general entry criteria (5 A*-C GCSE grades or equivalent including English and Maths) and subject criteria (varies by subject) are met.

Academy status
On 1 January 2013, Boston High School became a converter academy, under the leadership of the then headteacher, Dr Jason Howard. No changes were made to the school uniform and the school retained its existing name. This ended the federation between Boston High School and Boston Grammar School, with both schools now having an independent governing body, budget and establishment number.

History
Boston High School first opened on 19 January 1914 at Allan House on Carlton Road, Boston. There was a headmistress and seven teachers, with 112 girls on the roll. Due to increasing pupil numbers additional classrooms were built in 1922. The school's first headmistress was Miss F.M. Knipe, who served from 1914 until 1927, and there have been a further eight headteachers in the history of the school.

Move of school site
The school was moved to the current Spilsby Road Location on the northern rim of Boston during the autumn of 1938. However, the official opening ceremony did not take place until 1939, the year that the Second World War started. The school was declared open by Alderman Kitwood, who later would have a house named after him. During the war girls from Hull were enrolled into the school, having been evacuated from their own city in anticipation of strategic bombing raids by the Luftwaffe.

In 1956 the Mayoress of Boston was 17-year-old Janet Rowe. She had been invited to a Queen's garden party in London on 12 July of that year, but was unable to attend as she was sitting a GCE exam on the same day.

With the British Institute of Management IT competition in 1982, the school entered a team, on the day that BT launched its Confravision service on Thursday 9 September 1982, enabling the team to compete against a team from Assumption Grammar School, a Catholic girls' school in Ballynahinch, County Down.

County schools hockey championships were held at the school in the 1980s.

The school entered a team for Radio 4's former Top of the Form, in the first round (heat 2) against Skegness Grammar School on Wednesday 14 September 1983 at 6.30pm, with their second round against Colchester County High School for Girls being broadcast on 16 & 18 November 1983. The Colchester school would get to the final.

In the 1990s it also referred to itself as the High School, Boston, and had around 850 girls.

Federation plans
In 2006, there were controversial plans by Lincolnshire County Council to federate Boston High School with the local boys grammar school Boston Grammar School, with effect from September 2011. In 2010 it was announced that due to the withdrawal of Building Schools for the Future funding by the new coalition government, that both schools would operate as two separate schools, still under a federation - on two sites - with one governing body. This arrangement ended when Boston High School became an Academy in 2013.

Houses
The houses are named after people who have played a part in the school's history. The five houses and associated colours are:
Allan: Yellow,
Conway: Red,
Ingelow: Blue,
Kitwood: Purple,
Lindis: Green.

See also
 Boston Grammar School

References

External links
 Boston High School Official Website
 EduBase

Girls' schools in Lincolnshire
Grammar schools in Lincolnshire
Educational institutions established in 1914
Academies in Lincolnshire
Schools in Boston, Lincolnshire
1914 establishments in England